The  was a 149.1 mm calibre howitzer used by the Imperial Japanese Army during World War II. It was intended to replace the Type 4 15 cm howitzer in front line combat units from 1937, although it fired the same ammunition. It was first used in the Sino-Japanese War where in earned high praise from its users. Type 96 was used as the main howitzer of the IJA heavy artillery units until the end of WWII. The Type 96 designation was given to this gun as it was accepted in the year 2596 of the Japanese calendar (1936).

History and development
Work on developing a new field howitzer for the Japanese Army began in 1920 and continued for over a decade. The Japanese Army sent numerous military attachés to Europe during World War I and observed the effectiveness of sustained artillery barrages against fixed defenses and opposing infantry. The final specifications to meet the Army's requirements called for a howitzer that could be elevated to 65 degrees, with a maximum range of 12,000 yards, which could be transported by a team of six horses. The new design was ready by 1934, but Army Chief of Staff Kazushige Ugaki opposed its production until further tweaks were made. Production finally commenced in 1937. A total of 440 units were produced.

The revised Type 96 howitzer could be identified by a relatively short tube with muzzle only slightly forward of rectangular cradle, three demountable spade plates and demountable trail block for each trail end, wheel chocks and leaf springs above the axle.

Design
The Type 96 15 cm howitzer was regarded by Allied military intelligence to be one of the most modern, well designed and effective weapons in the Japanese arsenal. Mounted on sturdy, rubber-shod, wooden wheels, the weapon was normally tractor drawn. One of its outstanding characteristics was its extreme elevation capability of 65° (which could only be used when a deep loading pit was dug beneath the breech. Although the Type 96 (1936) 150 mm howitzer had been made in considerable quantity since the time of its adoption, it had not yet completely replaced the Type 4 150 mm howitzer in Japanese medium artillery units. The Type 96, the last artillery weapon developed during the period of redesigning, was heavier than the Type 4, had a somewhat greater range, and traveled as a single load drawn by tractor. In travel, it was jacked up on a leaf spring. During firing, the spring was depressed so the piece fired off its axle. The Type 96 used the same ammunition as the Type 4.

Ammunition used included high-explosive shells, as well as armor-piercing, Shrapnel, smoke and incendiary tracer shells.

Combat record

The Type 96 15 cm howitzer was first used in combat in the Second Sino-Japanese War and was highly praised by its crews. It was also used at the Nomonhan Incident in the Soviet-Japanese Border Wars.

After the start of the Pacific War, it was assigned to Japanese units at the Battle of Bataan and Battle of Corregidor in the Philippines, as well as at the Battle of Guadalcanal. Many units were at the Battle of Okinawa and the Soviet-Japanese War. It continued to be used as the main howitzer of Japanese artillery units until the end of World War II.

A surviving example is preserved at the Yushukan Museum at Yasukuni Shrine in Tokyo. Additional examples can be found in a parking lot in Bellevue, Washington, just east of 124th Ave. NE on the Bel-Red Road (complete with gun shield but without the breech block), and in front of the Veterans Memorial Building in San Luis Obispo, California, USA, although that one is in poor condition.  Another surviving example is on display in Olathe, Colorado at Lions Park, corner of 5th St and Hersum Ave. There is also another example present in Hampshire, at the war memorial park in Romsey which was captured by Louis Mountbatten.

References

Notes

Bibliography
 Bishop, Chris (ed.). The Encyclopedia of Weapons of World War II. Barnes & Noble. 1998. .
 Chamberlain, Peter and Gander, Terry. Light and Medium Field Artillery. Macdonald and Jane's, 1975. .
 Chant, Chris. Artillery of World War II. Zenith Press, 2001. .
 McLean, Donald B. Japanese Artillery; Weapons and Tactics. Wickenburg, Ariz.: Normount Technical Publications, 1973. .
 Mayer, S.L. The Rise and Fall of Imperial Japan. The Military Press, 1984. .
 War Department Special Series No 25 Japanese Field Artillery October 1944
 US Department of War. TM 30–480, Handbook on Japanese Military Forces. Louisiana State University Press, 1994. .

External links
 
 Taki's Imperial Japanese Army page
 US Technical Manual E 30–480
 ww2 database on the Type 96 15 cm Howitzer Field Gun

World War II field artillery
9
150 mm artillery
Military equipment introduced in the 1930s